Archaeosporales is an order of fungi best known as arbuscular mycorrhiza to vascular land plants (Tracheophyta). But also form free living endocyte symbioses with cyanobacteria. The free living forms have a Precambrian fossil record back 2.2 Ga, well before evolution of Tracheophyta.

References

Glomeromycota
Fungus orders